This is a list of the Fall 1976 PGA Tour Qualifying School graduates. The tournament was held at Rancho Viejo Resort and Golf Course in Brownsville, Texas. It was known for its "miserable weather."

Tournament summary 
A number of notable players did not successfully graduate onto the PGA Tour. They included Curtis Strange, then considered by some the top amateur in the country. Strange finished with three consecutive bogeys to miss qualifying by a shot. It was considered "the most stunning development" of the event. In addition, "sure-fire bets" Phil Hancock and Wayne Levi were also unsuccessful.

A number of notable players were successful, however. Strange's teammate from Wake Forest, Jay Haas, did successfully graduate. In his third attempt, Mark Lye successfully qualified for the PGA Tour. After several successful seasons abroad, Australian Graham Marsh earned his PGA Tour card for the first time. Lye and Marsh tied for third place. The newly turned professional Keith Fergus earned medalist honors by a sizable margin defeating Mike Sullivan by ten shots.

List of graduates 

Source:

References 

1976 2
PGA Tour Qualifying School Graduates
PGA Tour Qualifying School Graduates